Tomás Rojas Gómez (born 12 June 1980) is a Mexican professional boxer who held the WBC super flyweight title from 2010 to 2011.

Professional career
He won the WBC interim super flyweight title on 18 July 2009 against landsman Everardo Morales.

On 20 September 2010 Rojas won the WBC super flyweight title against Kohei Kono in Saitama, Saitama, Japan. On 5 February 2011, Rojas defended his title against former two time WBA super flyweight champion Nobuo Nashiro, winning by unanimous decision. Rojas lost his title to Suriyan Sor Rungvisai in Sisaket, Thailand on 19 August 2011.

Professional boxing record

See also
List of world super-flyweight boxing champions
List of Mexican boxing world champions

References

External links

 

1980 births
Living people
Mexican male boxers
Boxers from Veracruz
People from Veracruz (city)
Southpaw boxers
Super-flyweight boxers
Bantamweight boxers
World super-flyweight boxing champions
World Boxing Council champions